Gastón Alexander del Castillo (born 10 June 1997) is an Argentine professional footballer who plays as a forward for Saltillo FC in Mexico.

Career
Born in Avellaneda, Castillo was promoted to train with the Independiente first-team in August 2015. He made his professional debut for the club on 30 April 2016 in the Primera División against San Lorenzo. He came on as a 79th minute substitute for Leandro Fernández as Independiente lost 1–0.

On 30 August 2016, Castillo was loaned to Segunda División side Cádiz CF, for one year. He joined Arsenal de Sarandí on loan in August 2017.

In August 2019, Castillo was transferred to Saltillo FC in the Liga Premier Mexicana (3rd Division).

Personal life
Castillo is the brother of fellow footballers Mauricio del Castillo and Sergio Agüero.

Career statistics

References

External links
 
 

1997 births
Living people
Sportspeople from Avellaneda
Argentine footballers
Association football forwards
Club Atlético Independiente footballers
Argentine Primera División players
Segunda División players
Cádiz CF B players
Cádiz CF players
Arsenal de Sarandí footballers
Argentine expatriate footballers
Argentine expatriate sportspeople in Spain
Expatriate footballers in Spain
Argentine expatriate sportspeople in Mexico
Expatriate footballers in Mexico